WSB-FM (98.5 MHz) is a commercial radio station in Atlanta, Georgia.  It carries an adult contemporary radio format and is owned by the Cox Media Group, serving as the group's flagship FM station.  WSB-FM is the oldest FM radio station in Atlanta.  The studios and offices are on Peachtree Street NE in Atlanta, in the WSB-TV and Radio Group Building.

WSB-FM has an effective radiated power (ERP) of 100,000 watts.  The transmitter is at the end of New Street NE in the Edgewood neighborhood of Atlanta.  It shares the tower with WABE-TV, WSTR-FM and WVEE-FM.  It broadcasts in the HD Radio hybrid format; the HD2 subchannel airs a soft adult contemporary format, and the HD3 subchannel carries the Regional Mexican format heard on WLKQ-FM, and also feeds FM translator W296BB (107.1) in Jonesboro.

History

Early years
In the early 1940s, the Atlanta Constitution started an FM radio station.  After an experimental period, it became WCON-FM on 98.5 MHz.  The call sign contained the letters "CON" for "Constitution".   The competing Atlanta Journal had already put Atlanta's first AM station on the air in 1922, WSB.  In 1948, the Journal added a companion FM station, WSB-FM, broadcasting on 104.5 MHz.

When the two newspapers merged under Cox Enterprises ownership in 1952, WCON-FM and WSB-FM went silent.  WSB-FM returned to the air in 1955 on WCON-FM's dial position, 98.5 FM.  While it has the call letters of WSB-FM, the station traces its founding to when WCON-FM first signed on.

During its early years, when few people had FM radio receivers, WSB-FM mostly simulcast the programming on WSB (AM).  That included dramas, comedies, news and sports from the NBC Red Network, as well as local shows.  As network programming moved from radio to television in the 1950s, WSB-AM-FM carried a full service, middle of the road format of popular music, news, sports and information.

Beautiful music
In the 1960s, the Federal Communications Commission encouraged large market radio stations to provide separate programming on their FM outlets.  WSB-FM would began airing beautiful music, 15 minute sweeps of orchestral music, mostly cover versions of pop songs, as well as Hollywood and Broadway show tunes.  It was mostly automated.

A planned merger of General Electric and Cox in the late 1970s would have caused WSB-FM to be spun off.  Noted African-American broadcaster Ragan Henry had plans to acquire WSB-FM and use the call letters WEZA on the station, so it would no longer share its call sign with WSB-AM-TV, but the GE deal did not materialize.

Switch to AC
In the 1970s, WSB-FM added some soft vocals to its beautiful music playlist.  The ratio of vocals to instrumentals continued to increase until March 15, 1982, when the station formally switched to soft adult contemporary music and eliminated the instrumentals.

In the 1980s, many FM stations were rounding off their dial positions on the air; WSB-FM stopped identifying itself as 98.5 and rounded it off to "99FM." In 1985, WSB-FM sued its soft AC competitor WLTA-FM, owned by Susquehanna Broadcasting, which had begun calling itself "Warm 99."  Cox Broadcasting claimed trademark infringement, saying listeners would be confused with two Atlanta stations with similar formats using "99" as their dial position. Arbitron was having trouble crediting each station in the ratings because of the common use of "99."

Cox v. Susquehanna Broadcasting became a landmark case in United States district court.  The judge was handed a digital radio and asked to tune to 100.0 MHz, but there was no signal. To find the nearest station, he pressed the "Scan" button, and it stopped on 101.5 MHz (WKHX-FM). Next, he entered 99.0 MHz, which, again, contained no signal. Scanning from there, the radio hit 99.7, WLTA's frequency. In his precedent-setting decision, the judge stated that on a radio dial "a radio station's frequency is its address" and one cannot trademark an address. On June 25, he ruled in favor of Warm 99.  A short time later, WSB-FM began calling itself "B98.5FM".

Competing with 94.9
Another former beautiful music station, WPCH, made the transition to soft AC shortly after WSB-FM in the early 1980s.  The two stations were locked in a battle for "at-work listeners" for two decades, with formats designed for workplace listening.  WPCH, at various times, called itself "95 WPCH", "Peach 94.9", and "94.9 Lite FM," and even switched its call letters to WLTM.  On December 18, 2006, 94.9 flipped to country music as WUBL.

For a year, the soft AC format and WLTM call letters were moved to the weaker frequency of 96.7.  When that station (now WBZW) switched to classic country, WSB-FM became the only adult contemporary music station in Atlanta.  Over time, WSB-FM would move to a more upbeat AC direction.

DJs and programming changes
On December 29, 2006, WSB-FM became the Atlanta affiliate for the nationally syndicated Delilah show (which was previously broadcast on 94.9 Lite FM/Peach 94.9). Delilah was dropped from WSB-FM in December 2011.

On July 1, 2008, Steve McCoy and Vikki Locke joined WSB-FM as the morning hosts after 17 years at Adult Top 40 station WSTR "Star 94."  Steve McCoy was let go on February 25, 2010. In March 2011, Kelly Stevens from the old "Kelly and Alpha" show rejoined the station and was paired with Vikki. In August 2012, in the early morning hours one day, Stevens' SUV was totaled by a vehicle driving the wrong way while he was driving to work on the Georgia 400 Freeway.  The other driver was killed.  Stevens' left leg was broken and left elbow shattered, but he was in good spirits later in the morning at Grady Hospital, when he called in to the show.

In the past, WSB-FM produced an annual "Family Fun Fest" event, where companies that provide products for kids and families would showcase the products and services they offered. The show featured live events and appearances from local sports stars. The station conducted live broadcasts from the location both days of the event.  The festival ended in 2009.

During the spring of 2011, WSB-FM shook up its on-air staff and format due to declining ratings. All music before 1980 was dropped, more songs from the 2000s were added, and WSB-FM abandoned the longtime "Atlanta's Best Variety of Soft Rock" tagline.  Its slogan became "Your Favorites From the 80s, 90s, and Now," later shortened to "80s, 90s & Now".

From 2001 to 2003 and again from 2009 to 2011, each weekend WSB-FM would play only music from the 1980s.  On September 16, 2011, the station changed from "All-80's Weekends" to "80's and 90's Weekends."  As of January 2012, 1980s and 1990s weekends no longer air.  The station had previously aired all 1970s weekends during the 1990s.

On April 27, 2012, longtime WSB-FM afternoon DJ Kelly McCoy retired after 27 years in the same air shift, after joining the station in January 1985. At 4:00 that afternoon, WSB-FM aired a special tribute during his last show. It was the first time in recent memory that the station broke format during afternoon drive time.  McCoy was replaced by DJ Mike Shannon.  On January 4, 2013, Cox Radio management fired Shannon after just nine months on air.

Christmas music
Before 2004, WSB-FM would play all Christmas music on Christmas Eve and Christmas Day.  Beginning with the 2004 holiday season, and repeated each year, the station played all Christmas music from the day before Thanksgiving until December 25.  In 2012, the station did not go all-Christmas between Thanksgiving and Christmas Day, instead mixing Christmas songs in with the regular format.

In 2012, WSB-FM broadcast its usual AC format with mixed-in Christmas songs on Christmas Eve and Christmas Day. This is due to polls in 2012 that showed a majority of WSB-FM's listeners said they did not want all-Christmas music.  WSB-FM is a rare large market AC station that does not follow the all-Christmas format during the holidays.  Salem Media-owned WFSH-FM, a contemporary Christian station at 104.7, plays all Christmas music, religious and secular, from mid-November to Christmas Day, often hitting #1 in the Nielsen holiday ratings.

Former hosts
Denise Alexander, midday host (1987–1991)
Eddie Bauer, morning host (?-1999)
Brenda Bissett, midday host (1999–2001)  Later paired with her husband, Pete Michaels, as part of the syndicated morning show "Pete & Brenda In the Morning"
Brian Buzby, morning host 
Michael J. "Mike" Calhoun, morning host/newscaster (?-1999)
Marjorie Coley Davis, morning host/newscaster (2007–2008)
William C. "Barnacle Bill" Duncan, weekend host/fill-in WSB-FM, WJZF, WBTS (1994–2005)  Deceased 2007.
Jason Durden, traffic reporter (1996–2007)  Later on WSB-TV in News Chopper 2.
Sabrina Gibbons, morning host/newscaster (?-1998)  Later with 750 WSB and state lottery drawings.
Jordan Graye, midday host (1991-1999/2001-2015)
Christy Henry, morning host/newscaster (2003–2007)
Trevor Johns, morning host (?)
Jeff Laurence, Saturday Night Dance Party host (?-2001)
Vikki Locke, morning host (2008-2013)
Bobbi Marks, fill-in/weekend host (?-1999)
Bob (Bob Marsicano), morning show producer (1999–2000). Switched to 92.9 WZGC and later at Cox Radio Tampa.
Kelly McCoy, afternoon drive (1985-2012) 
Steve McCoy, morning host (2008–2010)
Gary McKee, morning host (1994-1996) Worked at WQXI-AM-FM 94 Q (now WSTR) 1971-1989. Left with WZGC Z 93 1997-99.
Charles McPhee, Dream Doctor Show host (2002–2004) Deceased 2011.
Michael Mitchell, Atlanta's Love Songs host (2001–2002)
Dale O'Brien, morning host (?) Later worked at 94.9 WPCH.
Nancy Richards, morning host/newscaster (1999–2003)
Chandler Steele, fill-in/weekend host (?)
Kelly Stevens, morning host (1999-2008 and 2011-2013)
Rebecca Stevens, Atlanta's Love Songs host (1985–2001) Later worked at 94.9 WPCH.
Larry "night train" Lane, overnight host (1987-2009)  Worked at WQXI 790/94.1 from 1975 through 1986.
Kristy Tanner, morning host (?-1999)
Alpha Trivette, morning host (1999–2008)
Larry O'Neal, middays (1983–84). Left to buy stations in Arkansas and American Samoa.
Kari Dean, 1982-1993 morning co-host/news/traffic. Later WPCH morning co-host/news. In 2005, became a TV news producer at WAGA-TV.
Jim Larsin, weekend/fill-in

References

External links

SB-FM
Cox Media Group
Radio stations established in 1948
WSB
Mainstream adult contemporary radio stations in the United States
1948 establishments in Georgia (U.S. state)